Bayesian Analysis is an open-access peer-reviewed scientific journal covering theoretical and applied aspects of Bayesian methods. It is published by the International Society for Bayesian Analysis and is hosted at the Project Euclid web site.

Bayesian Analysis is abstracted and indexed by Science Citation Index Expanded. According to the Journal Citation Reports, the journal has a 2011 impact factor of 1.650.

References

External links 
 

Statistics journals
Open access journals
Publications established in 2006
English-language journals
Quarterly journals
Academic journals published by international learned and professional societies